= Ancistrosoma reductum =

Scientific classification
- Kingdom: Animalia
- Phylum: Arthropoda
- Class: Insecta
- Order: Coleoptera
- Suborder: Polyphaga
- Infraorder: Scarabaeiformia
- Family: Scarabaeidae
- Genus: Ancistrosoma
- Species: A. reductum

Binomial name
- Ancistrosoma reductum Frey, 1964

Synonyms
- Ancystrosoma reductum

Species of beetle

Ancistrosoma reductum is a species of beetle of the family Scarabaeidae. It is found in Peru.

== Description ==
Adults reach a length of about 23–25 mm. The upper and lower surfaces are black and highly glossy, while the antennae and legs are reddish-yellow. The head is entirely covered with appressed yellow scale-like setae and the pronotum is bordered at the margins and base by a narrow stripe of yellow scale-like setae. A continuous stripe is located on the disc, flanked on each side by a wider stripe in the form of an elongated spot.
